Nationality words link to articles with information on the nation's poetry or literature (for instance, Irish or France).

Events

Works published in English

United Kingdom

 Christopher Anstey, The Poetical Works of the Late Christopher Anstey
 Mary Matilda Betham, Poems
 William Blake, Milton, including the poem "And did those feet in ancient time", illuminated book probably published about this year, although the book states "1804 on the title page, likely when the plates were begun
 Felicia Dorothea Browne (later "Felicia Hemans"):
 Poems
 England and Spain; or, Valour and Patriotism
 Robert Burns, Reliques of Robert Burnes (posthumous)
 Lord Byron, Poems Original and Translated, the second edition of Hours of Idleness, 1807
 William Cowper:
 Translator, Latin and Italian Poems of Milton Translated ito English Verse
 Translator, Poems Translated from the French of Mme de la Mothe Guion
 James Grahame, The Siege of Copenhagen
 Charles Lamb, Specimens of English Dramatic Poets, who Lived about the Time of Shakespeare, anthology
 Mary Leadbeater, Poems
 Thomas Moore, A Selection of Irish Melodies, parts 1 and 2; songs, published in 10 parts 1808–1834
 Amelia Opie, The Warrior's Return, and Other Poems
 Walter Scott, Marmion, 10 editions by 1821
 Mary Shelley, see John Taylor
 John Taylor, possibly, or Mary Shelley (uncertain attribution), Mounseer Nongtongpaw, a poem for children

Other in English
 William Cullen Bryant, The Embargo; or, Sketches of the Times. A Satire. The Second Edition, Corrected and Enlarged, Together with the Spanish Revolution, and Other Poems, Boston: "Printed for the author, by E. G. House"; United States a verse satire against the trade restrictions of Thomas Jefferson; Bryant's father had the poem published as a pamphlet, which gained regional popularity
 David Hitchcock, A Poetical Dictionary; or, Popular Terms Illustrated in Rhyme, United States

Works published in other languages
 Jacques Delille, Les Troi Règnes; France
 Johann Wolfgang von Goethe, Faust, part I, Germany
 Friedrich Hölderlin, "Der Rhein" and "Patmos", Germany

Births
Death years link to the corresponding "[year] in poetry" article:
 February 5 – Carl Spitzweg (died 1885), German romanticist painter and poet
 March 22 – Caroline Norton (died 1877), English society beauty, novelist, poet, pamphleteer and playwright
 March 25 – José de Espronceda (died 1842), Spanish
 May 22 – Gérard de Nerval, pen name of Gérard Labrunie (died 1855), French essayist, translator and Romantic poet
 May 31 – Horatius Bonar (died 1889), Scottish Free Church cleric and poet
 June 11 – James Ballantine (died 1877), Scottish painter, author and poet
 June 17 – Henrik Wergeland (died 1845), Norwegian poet, playwright, polemicist, historian and linguist
 c. September 7 or 8 – William Livingston (Uilleam Macdhunleibhe) (died 1870), Scottish Gaelic poet
 September 21 – Evan MacColl (died 1898), Scottish-born Canadian poet writing in Scottish Gaelic and English

Deaths
Birth years link to the corresponding "[year] in poetry" article:
 July 26 – Jacob Bailey, (born 1731), Church of England clergyman and poet born in the future United States, immigrated to Nova Scotia, Canada in 1779
 September 5 – John Home (born 1722), Scottish poet and dramatist
 November 4 – Melchiore Cesarotti (born 1730), Italian poet and translator
 c. November/December – Nólsoyar Páll (born 1766), Faroese merchant and poet, lost at sea
 date not known – Thomas Moss (born 1740), English clergyman and poet

See also

 Poetry
 List of years in poetry
 List of years in literature
 19th century in literature
 19th century in poetry
 Romantic poetry
 Golden Age of Russian Poetry (1800–1850)
 Weimar Classicism period in Germany, commonly considered to have begun in 1788  and to have ended either in 1805, with the death of Friedrich Schiller, or 1832, with the death of Goethe
 List of poets

Notes

 "A Timeline of English Poetry" Web page of the Representative Poetry Online Web site, University of Toronto

19th-century poetry
Poetry